This is an alphabetical list of fungal taxa as recorded from South Africa. Currently accepted names have been appended.

Ic
Genus: Icmadophila Trevis. 1852 (lichen)
Icmadophila ericetorum (L.) Zahlbr. 1895

Il
Genus: Ileodictyon Tul. & C. Tul. 1844
Ileodictyon cibarium Tul. & C. Tul. 1844

Im
Genus: Imbricaria (Schreb.) Michx. 1803 accepted as Anaptychia Körb., (1848)
Imbricaria hottentottum (Ach.) Schwend. 1863 accepted as Xanthoparmelia hottentotta (Ach.) A. Thell, Feuerer, Elix & Kärnefelt, (2006)

In
Genus: Inocybe (Fr.) Fr. 1863
Inocybe microspora J.E. Lange 1917 accepted as Inocybe glabripes Ricken, (1915)

Ir
Genus: Irene Theiss., Syd. & P. Syd. 1917, accepted as Asteridiella McAlpine, (1897)
Irene atra (Doidge) Doidge (1920), accepted as Asteridiella atra (Doidge) Hansf., (1961)
Irene calostroma (Desm.) Höhn. (1918), accepted as Appendiculella calostroma (Desm.) Höhn.,(1919)
Irene ditricha (Kalchbr. & Cooke) Doidge, (1920)
Irene ekebergiae Doidge (1941), accepted as Asteridiella ekebergiae (Doidge) Hansf., (1961)
Irene glabra  (Berk. & M.A. Curtis) Doidge (1920), accepted as Asteridiella glabra (Berk. & M.A. Curtis) Hansf., (1961)
Irene gloriosa (Doidge) Doidge (1920), accepted as Appendiculella natalensis (Doidge) Hansf., (1961)
Irene heudeloti (Gaillard) Doidge (1920),accepted as Irenina heudeloti (Gaillard) F. Stevens, (1927)
Irene implicata Doidge (1924), accepted as Asteridiella implicata (Doidge) Hansf., (1961)
Irene inermis (Kalchbr. & Cooke) Theiss. & P. Syd. (1917), accepted as Asteridiella inermis (Kalchbr. & Cooke) Hansf., (1961)
Irene natalensis (Doidge) Doidge (1920), accepted as Appendiculella natalensis (Doidge) Hansf., (1961)
Irene natalensis var. conferta (Doidge) F. Stevens (1927), accepted as Appendiculella natalensis (Doidge) Hansf., (1961)
Irene natalensis var. laxa (Doidge) F. Stevens (1927), accepted as Appendiculella natalensis (Doidge) Hansf., (1961)
Irene nuxiae  Syd. (1928), accepted as Asteridiella nuxiae (Syd.) Hansf., (1961)
Irene peddieae Doidge (1927), accepted as Asteridiella peddieae (Doidge) Hansf., (1961)
Irene peglerae (Doidge) Doidge (1920), accepted as Asteridiella peglerae (Doidge) Hansf., (1961)
Irene podocarpi (Doidge) Doidge (1920), accepted as Asteridiella podocarpi (Doidge) Hansf., (1961)
Irene puiggarii (Speg.) Doidge (1920)
Irene rinoreae Doidge (1922), accepted as Irenina rinoreae (Doidge) F. Stevens, (1927)
Irene scabra (Doidge) Doidge (1920), accepted as Asteridiella scabra (Doidge) Hansf., (1961)
Irene speciosa  (Doidge) Doidge (1920), accepted as Appendiculella speciosa (Doidge) Hansf., (1961)
Irene strophanthi (Doidge) Doidge (1920), accepted as Asteridiella strophanthi (Doidge) Hansf., (1961)
Irene zeyheri Doidge (1922), accepted as Irenina zeyheri (Doidge) F. Stevens, (1927)

Genus: Irenina  F. Stevens 1927 accepted as Appendiculella Höhn., (1919)
Irenina atra (Doidge) F. Stevens 1927 accepted as Asteridiella atra (Doidge) Hansf., (1961)
Irenina ditricha (Kalchbr. & Cooke) F. Stevens 1927
Irenina glabra (Berk. & M.A. Curtis) F. Stevens 1927 accepted as Asteridiella glabra (Berk. & M.A. Curtis) Hansf.,  (1961)
Irenina implicata (Doidge) F. Stevens 1927 accepted as Asteridiella implicata (Doidge) Hansf., (1961)
Irenina heudeloti (Gaillard) F. Stevens 1927
Irenina rinoreae (Doidge) F. Stevens 1927
Irenina scabra (Doidge) F. Stevens 1927 accepted as Asteridiella scabra (Doidge) Hansf., (1961)
Irenina strophanthi (Doidge) F. Stevens 1927 accepted as Asteridiella strophanthi (Doidge) Hansf., (1961)
Irenina zeyheri (Doidge) F. Stevens 1927

Genus: Irenopsis F. Stevens 1927
Irenopsis bosciae (Doidge) F. Stevens 1927
Irenopsis claviculata (Doidge) F. Stevens 1927
Irenopsis comata (Doidge) F. Stevens 1927
Irenopsis zehneriae (Van der Byl) F. Stevens 1927

Genus: Irpex Fr. 1825
Irpex africanus Van der Byl 1934
Irpex deformis Schrad. ex Fr. 1828 accepted as Schizopora paradoxa (Schrad.) Donk, (1967)
Irpex flavus Klotzsch 1833 accepted as Flavodon flavus (Klotzsch) Ryvarden, (1973)
Irpex fuscoviolaceus (Ehrenb.) Fr. [as fusco-violaceus] 1828, accepted as Trichaptum fuscoviolaceum (Ehrenb.) Ryvarden [as fusco-violaceus],(1972)
Irpex grossus Kalchbr. 1881
Irpex lacteus (Fr.) Fr. 1828
Irpex modestus Berk. ex Cooke 1891 accepted as Pseudolagarobasidium modestum (Berk. ex Cooke) Nakasone & D.L. Lindner, (2012)
Irpex obliquus (Schrad.) Fr. 1828 accepted as Schizopora paradoxa (Schrad.) Donk, (1967)
Irpex tabacinus Berk. & M.A. Curtis ex Fr. 1851, accepted as Hymenochaete odontoides S.H. He & Y.C. Dai, (2012)
Irpex vellereus Berk. & Broome 1873

Is
Genus: Isaria Pers. 1794
Isaria coralloidea Kalchbr. & Cooke 1880
Isaria psychidae Pole-Evans 1912
Isaria sp.

Genus: Isariopsis Fresen. 1863 accepted as Ramularia Unger, Exanth. (1833)
Isariopsis fuckelii (Thüm.) du Plessis 1942
Isariopsis griseola Sacc. 1878 accepted as Pseudocercospora griseola (Sacc.) Crous & U. Braun, (2006)

Genus: Isidium Ach. 1794 accepted as Pertusaria DC., in Lamarck & de Candolle, (1805)
Isidium tabulare Ach.*

Genus: Isipinga Doidge 1921 accepted as Asterina Lév., (1845)
Isipinga areolata Doidge 1921 accepted as Symphaster areolata (Doidge) Arx, (1962)
Isipinga contorta (Doidge) Doidge 1921 accepted as Asterinella contorta (Doidge) Hansf., (1946)

Genus: Isothea  Fr. 1849
Isothea rhytismoides Fr. 1849

It
Genus: Itajahya Möller 1895
Itajahya galericulata Möller 1895

Genus: Ithyphallus Gray 1821 accepted as Mutinus Fr., (1849)
Ithyphallus aurantiacus (Mont.) E. Fisch. 1888
Ithyphallus campanulatus Schlecht. (sic) possibly (Berk.) Sacc. 1888 accepted as Battarrea phalloides (Dicks.) Pers., (1801)

See also
 List of bacteria of South Africa
 List of Oomycetes of South Africa
 List of slime moulds of South Africa

 List of fungi of South Africa
 List of fungi of South Africa – A
 List of fungi of South Africa – B
 List of fungi of South Africa – C
 List of fungi of South Africa – D
 List of fungi of South Africa – E
 List of fungi of South Africa – F
 List of fungi of South Africa – G
 List of fungi of South Africa – H
 List of fungi of South Africa – I
 List of fungi of South Africa – J
 List of fungi of South Africa – K
 List of fungi of South Africa – L
 List of fungi of South Africa – M
 List of fungi of South Africa – N
 List of fungi of South Africa – O
 List of fungi of South Africa – P
 List of fungi of South Africa – Q
 List of fungi of South Africa – R
 List of fungi of South Africa – S
 List of fungi of South Africa – T
 List of fungi of South Africa – U
 List of fungi of South Africa – V
 List of fungi of South Africa – W
 List of fungi of South Africa – X
 List of fungi of South Africa – Y
 List of fungi of South Africa – Z

References

Sources

Further reading
 

Fungi
South African biodiversity lists
South Africa